District D is a historic worker housing district located in Manchester, New Hampshire, near the former Amoskeag Manufacturing Company millyard. It is roughly bounded by Canal, Langdon, Elm, and West Brook streets, and was added to the National Register of Historic Places on November 12, 1982.

Description and history
District D is located near the northern end of Manchester's mill district, between the mill buildings lining the canals next to the Merrimack River on the west, and Elm Street, the city's main downtown thoroughfare to the east. The district's historic buildings include two Second Empire worker rowhouses, oriented in an east-west direction facing West Brook and Langdon streets respectively, and a former overseer's house located further up the hill on the south side of West Brook Street. The rowhouses are each three-story brick buildings with mansard roofs, with four units set in a stepped arrangement to compensate for the sloping terrain. The overseer's house is a four-unit two-story brick building covered with a hip roof, oriented north-south. The front of the building faces up the hill, with two entrance bays sheltered by gabled porticos, while two-story ells project from the rear.

These buildings were among several built in 1864 for the Langdon Mills, whose buildings (only one of which survives) stood to the west across what is now Canal Street. They were built by the Amoskeag Manufacturing Company according to its plans, and were among the last to use a standard layout, in which the worker housing is nearest the mills, the overseers are further up the hill, and an agent's house (now no longer standing) on Elm Street, at the top of the rise. The overseer's building is now separated from the worker tenements by a 20th-century warehouse.

See also
National Register of Historic Places listings in Hillsborough County, New Hampshire
District A
District B
District C
District E

References

External links
Millyard Museum
Amoskeag Manufacturing Company Collection

Historic districts on the National Register of Historic Places in New Hampshire
Historic districts in Hillsborough County, New Hampshire
Buildings and structures in Manchester, New Hampshire
National Register of Historic Places in Manchester, New Hampshire
Amoskeag Manufacturing Company